Place Jean-Paul-Sartre-et-Simone-de-Beauvoir is a square in Saint-Germain-des-Prés in the 6th arrondissement of Paris, France.

History

It was named after Jean-Paul Sartre and Simone de Beauvoir, two French philosophers who were a couple. The pair lived close to the square at 42 rue Bonaparte.

This is one of the few squares in Paris to be officially named after a couple, like place Louise-Catherine-Breslau-et-Madeleine-Zillhardt and allée Claude-Cahun-Marcel-Moore, which is also situated in the 6th.

Access
Saint-Germain-des-Prés (Paris Métro) has access on the street.

Places of interests 
 Saint-Germain-des-Prés (abbey)
 Les Deux Magots
 Café de Flore

References

Jean-Paul-Sartre-et-Simone-de-Beauvoir
Buildings and structures in the 6th arrondissement of Paris
Tourist attractions in Paris